Jeffery D. Long (born 1969) is a religious studies scholar who works on the religions and philosophies of India, particularly Hinduism and Jainism.  He is a professor of religion and Asian studies at Elizabethtown College.

Education and career 
Long graduated with a BA from the University of Notre Dame in 1991.  During his time at Notre Dame, he converted from Catholicism to Hinduism, as later informed his work. He received his MA and PhD at the University of Chicago Divinity School in 1993 and 2000, respectively.  His PhD thesis was titled Plurality and Relativity: Whitehead, Jainism, and the Reconstruction of Religious Pluralism. He began work at Elizabethtown College in 2000.

Long has authored four books on Hinduism and Jainism.  He was a consultant to the Hindu American Foundation during its lawsuit against the California Board of Education.

Books

References

External links 
 

Hindu studies scholars
American religion academics
American male writers
Living people
American Hindus
University of Notre Dame alumni
University of Chicago alumni
Elizabethtown College faculty
1969 births